Microcalligraphy is a Chinese art form that involves writing small Chinese characters on porcelain with a brush. The characters can form different shapes.

Chinese calligraphy